Interstate 540 (I-540) is a freeway spur route of I-40 in the US state of Arkansas in Fort Smith. At first, I-540 was a short spur connecting Fort Smith and Van Buren to I-40 as one of the original five Arkansas Interstates. The growing Northwest Arkansas area and the University of Arkansas needed an Interstate connection to Little Rock, and through traffic north to Kansas City had also outgrown the winding US 71 north from I-40. The route was extended north to Mountainburg in the late 1990s on an all-new alignment (going under concurrency with I-40, one of the only auxiliary routes with a concurrency with its parent) with the route being completed to Bella Vista in January 1999. However, the segment north of I-40 became a part of I-49 in 2014.

Route description
The older portion of I-540, completed in the 1970s, connects I-40 southward to the Oklahoma state line, going through Van Buren and Fort Smith. That point marks mile 0 on this spur, in keeping with Interstate Highway rules that spur mileage begins at the "parent" route. The first  are through Van Buren before the bridge over the Arkansas River. The Arkansas Highway and Transportation Department (AHTD), now the Arkansas Department of Transportation (ArDOT), bid a $79-million (equivalent to $ in ) project in 2013 for I-540 rehabilitation in Fort Smith that includes resigning the route and renumbering the exits.

Fort Smith route
Beginning at the I-540 and I-40 junction in Van Buren, the route begins southward along the eastern boundary of Van Buren, with exits numbered sequentially heading south. The segment is largely concurrent with US 71. The first exit along this segment of I-540/US 71 is with US 64 and U.S. Highway 71 Business (US 71B), which leads west into the Van Buren Historic District and east to Alma. Continuing south, I-540/US 71 passes over Highway 162 (AR 162, Kibler Road), with no access between the routes. An exit providing access to AR 59, via Riggs Drive (southbound) or Twin Circle Drive (northbound), is just prior crossing the Arkansas River. After crossing the river, the highways enter Fort Smith and Sebastian County. I-540/US 71 run through a commercial area and has three exits with city collector roads before an exit for Phoenix Avenue, which gives access to Fort Smith Regional Airport. However, this exit does not have any access to southbound I-540/US 71.

Now turning toward the southwest, I-540/US 71 have exits with AR 45 (Greenwood Road) and AR 255 (Zero Street). Following these intersections, US 71 departs I-540 southbound toward Texarkana, with US 71B terminating at the parent route at the exit. I-540 begins to pass through a residential area before its final exit at US 271 and AR 253. Following this exit, the roadway continues but ceases to be I-540, becoming US 271 and entering Oklahoma.

History
The Interstate spur opened in phases. According to a 1970 road map of Fort Smith, exits 2–11 (Van Buren through the Zero Street exit) were opened, with later exits (12–14) and the roadway itself still under construction. Portions of the roadway that became I-540 around Fayetteville were built in the early 1970s but upgraded and extended in the mid-1990s. The highway around Fayetteville originally received US 71 signage until the complete I-540 spur was opened.

Originally, I-540 running from I-40 to Oklahoma through Fort Smith was originally signed east–west, but, with the construction of the spur that ran north through Northwest Arkansas to Bella Vista, the entire I-540 was resigned as a north–south road. It is one of the few that have changed this way.

In the late 1990s, I-540 was extended into Northwest Arkansas. It had been planned since the 1970s as a bypass of US 71. The first section, between Alma and Mountainburg, was known as AR 540. Originally, the AHTD asked the American Association of State Highway and Transportation Officials (AASHTO), who are in charge of Interstate and U.S. Highway route numbering, to allow the Interstate segment between Fort Smith and Bentonville to be named I-49 in order to emphasize plans to extend the route from Shreveport, Louisiana, through Arkansas to Kansas City, Missouri. AASHTO refused and the route opened on January 8, 1999, as a northern extension of I-540. On October 18, 2013, AASHTO approved AHTD's application to designate I-49 across the state, specifically allowing the state to renumber I-540 as I-49. The northern section of I-540 was renumbered I-49 in April 2014.

Exit list

Arkansas Highway 540

Highway 540 (AR 540, Ark. 540, and Hwy. 540) was a temporary designation for what would later become I-540 between Alma and Mountainburg in the US state of Arkansas.

References

External links

40-5
40-5 Arkansas
540 Arkansas
Transportation in Crawford County, Arkansas
Transportation in Sebastian County, Arkansas